In scientific publishing, the 1969 Ingelfinger rule originally stipulated that The New England Journal of Medicine (NEJM) would not publish findings that had been published elsewhere, in other media or in other journals. The rule was subsequently adopted by several other scientific journals, and has shaped scientific publishing ever since. Historically it has also helped to ensure that the journal's content is fresh and does not duplicate content previously reported elsewhere, and seeks to protect the scientific embargo system.

The Ingelfinger rule has been seen as having the aim of preventing authors from performing duplicate publications which would unduly inflate their publication record. On the other hand, it has also been stated that the real reason for the Ingelfinger rule is to protect the journals' revenue stream, and with the increase in popularity of preprint servers  such as arXiv, bioRxiv, and HAL many journals have loosened their requirements concerning the Ingelfinger rule. In a defense of the policy, the journal said in an editorial that the practice discouraged scientists from talking to the media before their work was peer reviewed.

The rule is named for Franz J. Ingelfinger, the NEJM editor-in-chief who enunciated it in 1969. An earlier version of the policy had been expressed in 1960 by Samuel Goudsmit, editor of the Physical Review Letters, but did not become as well known.

See also
List of academic journals by preprint policy
News embargo
Network effect

References

Further reading

 
 

Academic publishing
Peer review
Rules
1969 introductions